The Yemen national under-23 football team represents Yemen in international under  23 football competitions.

Olympic Record

Asian Games Record
(Under-23 Team Since 2002)

U-23 Asian Cup Record
(Under-22 in 2013)

Recent results and forthcoming fixtures
Main article: Yemen national under-23 football team match results:

Players

Current squad
Squad called up for 2014 AFC U-22 qualification

|-----
! colspan="9" bgcolor="#B0D3FB" align="left" |
|----- bgcolor="#0000FF"

|-----
! colspan="9" bgcolor="#B0D3FB" align="left" |
|----- bgcolor="#0000FF"

|-----
! colspan="9" bgcolor="#B0D3FB" align="left" |
|----- bgcolor="#0000FF"

Coaching staff

See also
 Yemen national football team

References 

 

under-23
Asian national under-23 association football teams